Bsarma   is a Christian village in Koura District of Lebanon. The population  is Greek Orthodox and Maronite.

References

External links
Bsarma, Localiban

Eastern Orthodox Christian communities in Lebanon
Maronite Christian communities in Lebanon
Populated places in the North Governorate
Koura District